Albanian Athletics Federation (FSHA) (Albanian: Federata Shqiptare e Atletikës) is the governing body for the sport of athletics in Albania.

Affiliations 
International Association of Athletics Federations (IAAF)
European Athletic Association (EAA)
Albanian National Olympic Committee

National records 
AAF maintains the List of Albanian records in athletics.

External links 
Official webpage 

Albania
Athletics
National governing bodies for athletics